Bernd Erich Gall (born August 2, 1956) is a German painter and conceptual artist.

In the early 1980s he was a representative of the "Neue Wilde", a group of German artists. In the 1990s it came to a stylistic imposition. The crude, strong, expressive figuration was replaced by a compositional color abstraction. Clear, strong color fields generated the basic formula of Gall’s paintings and built a distance to symbolize his art work. Objects and installations enlarged his artistic spectrum.

Current art work 

Bernd Erich Gall lives and works in Karlsruhe, Germany. His large sized actual works are geometrical "color field paintings" (oil on canvas). Gall’s conceptual modus operandi comes to the fore by his objects, installations, new media and video art.

Bibliography 

Catalog
 Gall, Bernd Erich: Town House Motel. Catalog, 62 p., 2018.
 Gall, Bernd Erich: She came here to seek shelter from biting winter winds. Catalog, Objects, 62 p., 2015.
 Gall, Bernd Erich: Tagebuch eines Idioten. Catalog, 72 p., 2013. 
 Gall, Bernd Erich: Empty Rooms. Catalog, 62 p., 2013.
 Gall, Bernd Erich: Wand. Catalog, 50 p., 2012.
 Gall, Bernd Erich: Playground. Catalog, 46 p., KA 2005.
 Zuehlke, Susanne; De Temple, Christoph; Gall, Bernd Erich: Synergetisch. Catalog, 26 p., Karlsruhe 2001.
 Gall, Bernd Erich: The End Of The Iron Age. Catalog, 40 p., LA 2000.
 Gall, Bernd Erich: Take Roses. Catalog, 40 p., LA 1997.
 Gall, Bernd Erich: WO-MEN II. Catalog, 42 p., LA 1995.
 Gall, Bernd Erich: wo-man. Catalog, 34 p., LA 1993.

Art-magazine
 der infant, journal of contemporary art.

 97/1: Take Roses · They said it made the job more dangerous.
 98/1: 8 till late shop · TV-Welten als Surrogat konsumtiver Daseins/Datenverluste.
 99/1: Assiduity In The Bee-House.
 99/2: Okzidentierung · Die Sonnenuntergangsrichtung als Lebensform (Dietmar Kamper).
 01/1: Discovery Channel · Click Here To Disappear Completely.

Essay
 Gall, Bernd Erich: Discovery Channel - Click Here To Disappear Completely. Essay, dada-schriftenreihe, 12 p., 2001.
 Gall, Bernd Erich: Zur Dialektik meiner Leinwandarbeiten. Katalog Take Roses, LA 1998.
 Gall, Bernd Erich: 8 Till Late Shop · How to come into being. Der Infant 98/1, dada-Schriftenreihe, Pforzheim 1998.
 Gall, Bernd Erich: Take Roses. Der Infant 97/1, Pforzheim 1997.
 Wesner, Rudolf: Wahrhaftigkeit des Spontanen - Zu den Leinwandarbeiten Bernd Erich Galls. Der Infant 97/1, Pforzheim 1997.
 Littmann, Franz: Entrückung - Das Fremde oder vom Scheitern der Vernunft. Catalog WO-MEN II, LA 1995.
 Rein, Ulrike: Frauenbilder - Eine kunstgeschichtliche Erinnerung. Catalog WO-MEN II, LA 1995.
 Wellhöner, Frank: Basic Instinct - Von der archetypischen Befindlichkeit im künstlerischen Kosmos. Catalog WO-MEN II, LA 1995.
 Gall, Bernd Erich: Flimmernde Sequenzen. Catalog WO-MEN II, LA 1995.

Other
 beg56: tripdown. Audio-CD, 10 paintings, OJ 101010, 2010.
 beg56: funkyjob. Audio-CD, 9 paintings, OJ 070131, 2007.
 beg56: homeless. Audio-CD, 9 paintings 4 homeless, OJ 050912, 2004.

Paintings

Objects

See also
 List of German painters

External links 

 Homepage Bernd Erich Gall
 Catalog · Paintings Und, 2019
 Catalog · Photography The Club, 2018
 Catalog · Photography Town House Motel, 2018
 Catalog · Objects She came here to seek shelter from biting winter winds, 2015
 Catalog · Photography Empty Rooms, 2013
 Catalog · Drawing Tagebuch eines Idioten, 2013
 Catalog · Painting Wand, 2012
 Catalog · Painting Playground, 2005
 Journal der infant, 2001
 Catalog · Painting The End Of The Iron Age, 2000
 Journal der infant, 1999
 Journal der infant, 1998
 Deutsche Nationalbibliothek Bernd Erich Gall

1956 births
20th-century German painters
20th-century German male artists
German male painters
21st-century German painters
21st-century German male artists
Artists from Karlsruhe
German contemporary artists
Postmodern artists
Living people